The Visa-Bikar 2007 was the forty-eighth season of the Icelandic national football cup. It started on 11 May 2007 and concluded with the Final held on 6 October 2007. The winners qualified for the second qualifying round of the UEFA Cup 2008–09.

Preliminary round

Ties were played on 11 and 12 May.

First round
The First Round consisted of 32 teams from lower Icelandic divisions. The matches were played on 16  and 17 May 2007.

Second round
The Second Round  matches were played on 31 May and 1 June 2007.

Third round
Third round matches were played on 11 and 12 June 2007.

Fourth round
The matches were played on 25 and 25 June 2007.

Fifth round

The matches were played on 10 and 11 July 2007.

Quarterfinals
The matches were played on 12 and 13 August 2007.

Semifinals
The matches were played on 31 August and 1 September 2007.

Final

External links
 RSSSF Page

2007 domestic association football cups
2007 in Icelandic football
2007